Heiney is a surname. Notable people with the surname include:

 Donald Heiney (1921–1993), American sailor, academic, and writer
 Paul A. Heiney, American physicist
 Paul Heiney (born 1949), English television presenter

See also
 Hiney (surname)